Edit Soós (7 August 1934 – 13 July 2008) was a Hungarian film and television actress. She appeared in 60 films between 1956 and 2006.

Selected filmography
 A Very Moral Night (1977)
 Cserepek (1980)
 Temporary Paradise (1981)
  (1983)

External links

1934 births
2008 deaths
Hungarian film actresses
Hungarian television actresses
Actresses from Budapest